Grafton is an unincorporated community in Black Township, Posey County, in the U.S. state of Indiana.

History
Grafton was laid out in 1852 near the site of a gristmill on Big Creek. The community was named after Grafton, Illinois. The Grafton post office closed in 1902.

Geography

References

Unincorporated communities in Posey County, Indiana
Unincorporated communities in Indiana